Local elections was held in the City of San Pedro on May 9, 2016 within the Philippine general election. The voters elected for the elective local posts in the city: the mayor, vice mayor, and ten councilors.

Mayoral and vice mayoral election
Incumbent Mayor Lourdes S. Catáquiz decided to run for reelection under the coalition of Liberal Party and Nacionalista Party. Her opponents are Incumbent Vice Mayor Rafael Campos of the Partido Demokratiko Pilipino-Lakas ng Bayan, Incumbent councilor Michael M. Casacop of the People's Reform Party and Barangay Captain Eugenio Ynion, Jr. of the Nationalist People's Coalition.

Incumbent Vice Mayor Rafael Campos is running for mayor, Councilor Diwa T. Tayao is running in the position of Vice Mayor her opponent are former Vice Mayor Norvic Solidum and Councilor Iryne Vierneza.

Candidates

Mayor

Vice Mayor

Councilors

|-bgcolor=black
|colspan=8|

References

2016 Philippine local elections
Elections in San Pedro, Laguna
2016 elections in Calabarzon